Litky is a village located in Khmelnytskyi Raion, Khmelnytskyi Oblast (province) of Ukraine. 

Litky was previously located in the Derazhnia Raion. The raion was abolished on 18 July 2020 as part of the administrative reform of Ukraine, which reduced the number of raions of Khmelnytskyi Oblast to three. The area of Derazhnia Raion was merged into Khmelnytskyi Raion.

References

Villages in Khmelnytskyi Raion